Video game culture or gaming culture is a worldwide new media subculture formed by video game hobbyists. As video games have exponentially increased in sophistication, accessibility and popularity over time, they have had a significant influence on popular culture, particularly among middle class adolescents and young adults. Video game culture has also evolved with Internet culture and the increasing popularity of mobile games.

People who regularly play video games often identify as gamers, a term that can mean anything from players who only enjoy casual gaming, to passionate enthusiasts and professional gaming competitors. As video games become more social with multiplayer and online capability, gamers find themselves in growing social networks. Playing video games can both be entertainment as well as competition, as the trend known as electronic sports or esports has become more widely accepted. Video game-focused gaming conventions have become popular social gathering events among computer enthusiasts since early 21st century, and gaming system reviews and gameplay streamings have become significant part of the geek culture.

Definition
Video game culture is broadly considered a description of the subculture of those who play video games. This not only includes gamers, players that frequently dedicate time and effort to playing video games, but also those players that participate less frequently and often through more casual games. Because of the interactive nature of video games, the video game culture differs from other subculture as there is interest not only in who plays video games (the demographics), but the types of video games they play, and how they play them.

The concept that video games had its own subculture was first suggested in 1996, but became more predominate as an area of academic study since the 2010s.

Demographics

, the average age for a video game player is 31, a number slowly increasing as people who were children playing the first arcade, console and home computer games continue playing and adopting newer systems. The gender distribution of gamers is reaching equilibrium, according to a 2016 study showing that 59% of gamers are male and 41% female; however, research has also shown that women are less likely to self-identify as gamers out of fear of stigmatization.  ESA reported that 71% of people age six to forty-nine in the United States played video games, with 55% of gamers playing on their smartphones or mobile devices. The average age of players across the globe is mid- to late 20s, and is increasing as older players grow in numbers.

One possible reason for the increase in players could be attributed to the growing number of video game genres that require less of a specific audience. For example, the Wii console has widened its audience with games such as Wii Sports and Wii Fit, both requiring more physical activity from the user and provide more reasons to play including family competition or exercise. It could also be because people who played video games when they were young are now growing older but still retain that interest in games. Currently, the largest entertainment industry for children is gaming. According to a 2008 telephone survey with a sample size of 1,102 respondents, 97% of children living in the United States and between the ages of 12 and 17 play video games.

LAN gaming

Video games are played in a variety of social ways, which often involve domestic gatherings or even in public places. A popular method of accomplishing this is a LAN (Local Area Network) party, which is hosted at a home and involves family and friends, creating a social event for people-friendly with each other. LAN parties are often held in large-scale events conducted in public spaces and have a great number of participants who might not usually socialize.

The Everquest Fan Faires for instance, provide weekends of socializing and playing, at a large gathering (an event of several thousand) of dedicated game fans. Terry Flew in his book Games: Technology, Industry, Culture also emphasizes the Online Gaming Communities – "where players aren't physically located in the same space, but still socializing together". This raises the notion of McLuhan's "Global Village", as people can transcend their physical limitations and communicate with people, possessing a similar interest, from all around the world. Shapiro also stresses the possibility of "Using technology to enhance one's social life", as friendships no longer have to be structured by physical proximity (e.g. neighbors, colleagues). Shapiro states that "the net (Online Gaming Communities) allows individuals to extend their social network in a novel way, to communicate and share life experiences with people regardless of where they live and form online relationships". Thus, such online communities satisfy a genuine need for affiliation with like-minded others.

Online gaming

Online gaming has drastically increased the scope and size of video game culture. Online gaming grew out of games on bulletin board systems and on college mainframes from the 1970s and 1980s. MUDs offered multiplayer competition and cooperation, but on a scope more geographically limited than on the Internet. The Internet allowed gamers from all over the world – not just within one country or state – to play games together with ease. With the advent of Cloud Gaming high-performance games can now be played from low-end client systems and even TVs.

One of the most groundbreaking titles in the history of online video games is Quake, which offered the ability to play with sixteen and eventually up to thirty-two players simultaneously in a 3D world. Gamers quickly began to establish their organized groups, called clans. Clans established their own identities, their marketing, their form of internal organization, and even their looks. Some clans had friendly or hostile rivalries, and there were often clans who were allied with other clans. Clan interaction took place on both professionally set competition events, and during normal casual playing where several members of one clan would play on a public server. Clans would often do their recruiting this way; by noticing the best players on a particular server, they would send invitations for that player to either try out or accept membership in the clan.

Gamers of all ages play online games, with the average age being 33 years old.

'Clan'- or 'guild'-based play has since become an accepted (and expected) aspect of multiplayer video games, with several games offering cash-prize tournament-style competition to their players.  Many clans and guilds also have active fan-bases, which, when combined with the 'tournament' aspect, contribute to turning clan-based gaming into a semi-professional sport.

Clans also allow players to assist each other in simulated combat and quests in-game advancement, as well as providing an online family for friendly socializing.

From Quake, online video games grew beyond first-person shooters and have impacted every genre. Real-time strategy, racing games, card games, sports games can all be played online. Online gaming has spread from its initial computer roots to console video games as well. Today, every major video game console available offers degrees of online gaming, some limited by particular titles, some even offer up entire virtual communities.

Competition

Slang and terminology

Like other cultures, the community has developed a gamut of slang words or phrases that can be used for communication in or outside of games. Due to their growing online nature, modern video game slang overlaps heavily with Internet slang, as well as Leetspeak, with many words such "pwn", as well as "noob", being direct carry-overs from Leetspeak.  There are terms to describe video game events, game genres, gamer demographics, strategies, specific events, situations, and more. It is especially common among online games to encourage the use of neologisms for convenience in communication.

Most video games contain certain language or communication familiar to game and its player base. Overall the gaming community has common phrases that are used universally. The two most common phrases are "noob", which relates to a player who is low in skill and that they are relatively new to the game. The other phrase is "lol", which means "laughing out loud", this phrase is also used outside of gaming. There are also phrases that players use before and at the end of their matches. The abbreviation of "GL HF" is seen at the start meaning, "good luck, have fun". Then at the end, whether people win or lose, players use "GG", meaning "good game" to their opponents. A popular abbreviation the gaming culture created and uses is "AFK". This means "away from keyboard", and is used when a player is not using their keyboard or controller and are not paying attention.

Gaming networks
The shift from console-based or "shrink-wrap" video games to online games has allowed online games and massively-multiplayer online gaming today to develop highly advanced and comprehensive communication networks. With the freedom of the Internet's architecture, users can become producers of the technology and shapers of the growing networks. Compared to past eras where consumers had little means of communication with game developers and other communities beyond their geographical location, the Internet has created many methods of communication such as through the online bulletin board website, Reddit. Gamers can often develop sub-communities in-game clans and may use third party VOIP programs to communicate while playing games such as Skype, Ventrillo, Teamspeak or Discord. These video game communities may have nothing in common, or instead be designed for dedicated, skilled players, or even clans made for those with shared commonalities such as personality, ethnicity, heritage, language or gender.

Another key component of many video game networks is the connection between the player base and the game developers. Many game developers have outlets either through official website forums or social media where gamers can communicate with and provide feedback to the game developers. Likewise, these same places become key locations for game developers to communicate with their fans, were often dedicated employees act as liaisons as a bridge between the company and the community.

Some of the most advanced networks take place with massively-multiplayer online gaming where servers of tens of thousands can be present simultaneously in the same instance or environment. In major titles such as World of Warcraft and League of Legends, the player base is in the millions. With so many people, many of these communities may develop virtual economies that may use a barter system or currency system. In some games, the interest in the virtual economies may be so great players will spend real money through auction sites like eBay for virtual property and items, commonly known as RMT (Real Market Trading). Some game developers may ban RMT in their games, especially when it interferes with the equity of the game. That being said, other game developers embrace it with one game, Second Life, with its entire focus on the usage of real-life currency for everything in the game world.

Since smartphones became commonplace around 2007, mobile video games have seen rapid increases in popularity. The widespread appeal of simple, "time-killing" games, reminiscent of "social games" such as those found on Facebook, has set the stage for mobile video games to account for almost 35% of video games' total market share by 2017. Because games such as Clash of Clans offer in-game bonuses for referring new players to the game, mobile gamers have turned to social media sites to recruit their friends and family. Some games even offer integrated social media support to provide players with in-game chat or "friends" features for communicating and competing with other players. A large number of mobile game players has led to the creation of devoted forums, blogs, and tip sites similar to those committed to console video games. Popular video game publications, like Ars Technica and TouchArcade are even beginning to give significant coverage to mobile games.

Debate over social culture versus antisocial culture

There has been much debate among media theorists as to whether video games are an inherently social or anti-social activity. Terry Flew argues that digital games are "increasingly social, a trend that works against the mainstream media's portrayal of players as isolated, usually adolescent boys hidden away in darkened bedrooms, failing to engage with the social world." He asserts that games are played in very social and public settings; for example computers and consoles are often played in living areas of domestic homes, where people play with family or friends.

David Marshall argues against the rich source of "effects" based research, finding that games are "deliberating and anti-social forms of behavior". Rather suggesting that "the reality of most games is that they are dynamically social – the elaborate social conversations that emerge from playing games online in massive multi-player formats" (MMOG). Exemplifying 'The Sims Online', he states "has built up entire political and social structures in given communities' that provide an elaborate game life for participants". Gamers in these online worlds participate in many-to-many forms of communication and one-to-one correspondence. The games are not only massive; they are also "intimate and social".

Gosney argues that Alternate Reality Gaming is also inherently social, drawing upon Pierre Levy's (Levy 1998) notion of Collective Intelligence. He states that the game relied upon an "unprecedented level of corroboration and collective intelligence to solve the game". The issue of collective and corroborative team play is essential to ARG, thus are anything but a solitary activity.

Hans Geser further rejects the mainstream media view that video games as an anti-social activity, asserting "there is considerable empirical evidence that Second Life serves mainly to widen the life experience of individuals who have already a rich 'First Life', not as a compensating device for marginal loners." Thus highlighting the "fantastic social possibilities of Second Life", as the intangible reward of social belongingness is of paramount importance. Bray and Konsynski also argue the ability of the technology "to enrich their lives", as most Millennials report: "No difference between friendships developed in the real world vs. friendships developed online, and most use the Internet to maintain their social networks and plan their social activities".

Social implications of video games

The advent of video games gave an innovative media technology, that allowed consumers to archive, annotate, appropriate and recirculate media content. Consumers can use this media source as an alternative tool to gain access to information of their interest. The community aspect of video gaming has also had implications for the social interactions and collective behaviors of consumers involved in the activity.

Rise of subcultures
Contemporary investigations have found that there is a prevailing social framework in place during gatherings of video game enthusiasts or 'gamers'. Mäyrä (2008, p. 25) suggests that gamers who gather together to play possess a shared language, engage in collective rituals and are often interested in cultural artifacts such as video game paraphernalia. Cronin and McCarthy (2011) have also explored a liminal, hedonic food culture to be present among these socially connected actors. The commensal consumption of energy-dense low nutrient foods is considered to be appropriated during long stretches of gameplay to contribute to the community and hedonistic aspects of social gaming.
In response to the central importance that food plays in the collective enjoyment of social gaming, various websites have been created which allow gamers to rate their favorite foods to accompany play.

The presence of rituals, shared discourse, collective action, and even a liminal food culture among video game communities gives credence to the concept of these cohorts existing as self-defining sub-units within mainstream culture. However, due to the ephemeral and transient nature of their rituals, and also the possibility of virtual interaction through online participation, these cohorts should be considered 'postmodern subcultures'. Video game communities have social elements beyond physical interaction and have come to a stage where online and offline spaces can be seen as 'merged' rather than separate.

MMORPG and identity tourism
Terry Flew (2005)(p. 264) suggests that the appeal of the "Massively Multiplayer Online Role-Playing Game" lie in the idea of escapism, and the ability to assume the role of someone or something that is a fantasy in real life. He notes that '...for some women, [they] enjoy adopting what they feel to be an image of femininity more acceptable or desirable than their real-world body...'

This is what he calls "identity tourism", a form of hopping from one person to another, for which there usually is a stereotypical discourse associated with the protagonist. This is seen in the case of males who assume the personas of the female gender, and the character's representation of her gender being overly sexualized and/or passive, '...this tends to perpetuate and accentuate existing stereotypes of... women...' (Nakamura).

Ownership
Ownership of video game entities is a major issue in video game culture. On one side, players, especially those who played with avatars for several years, have treated the avatars as their property. On the other hand, publishers claim ownership of all in-game items and characters through the EULA (End User License Agreements). Terry Flew recognized this problem: "Intellectual property is much better suited to conventional 'texts' that are fixed or finished, rather than ongoing collaborative creations like games". He also highlights that these issues will only worsen; as more interactive games emerging, issues of regulation, ownership, and service will only get more problematic.

Violence narrative
A source of criticism that the public often aims at in video games is the violence that they contain. Terry Flew relates this back to the idea of 'moral panic'. He writes that through research the 'computer games cause violence' discussion is mainly focused on psychology. The idea is influenced after horrible shooting events that took place, with the shooting at Columbine High School in Colorado in 1999 being an example. Flew says that assuming this idea, of cause and effect behavior of video games, is one that is flawed. Several studies have shown a correlation between violent content in media and aggressive behavior. At the same time other studies have shown evidence the connection between violent games and violent behavior is thin and unlikely.

Fox News reported that Montreal shooting case in Canada was carried out by the criminal Kimveer Gill, who is a player of Super Columbine Massacre, whose narrative attaches with strong violence sense. On the other hand, some people who hold social determinism theory assert technology is neutral, but it is the way that humans manipulate technology which brings about its social impact.

Issues of gender and sexuality

In conjunction with the changing demographics of video game creators and players, issues related to women and video games, including sexism in video gaming and gender representation in video games, have received increased attention by academia, the media, the games industry and by gamers themselves. The issue was brought to wider attention as a result of the 2014 Gamergate harassment campaign, in which some gamers, under the pretense of calling out ethical issues in game journalism, harassed and threatened several female developers and those that supported the developers. Gamergate was described by Bob Stuart in The Daily Telegraph as "an unwieldy movement with no apparent leaders, mission statement, or aims beyond calling out..those who want to see more diversity in gaming"

Benjamin Paaßen has argued that because video game culture has long been a space dominated by heterosexual men, the video game industry tends to cater to this particularly lucrative audience, producing video games that reflect the desires of the heterosexual male gaze.  He further argues that this lack of representation of alternate identities in video games has caused gamers who divert from the dominant demographic to be often relegated to the margins of the culture.  This process is thus seen to perpetuate the stereotypical image of the geeky, heterosexual male gamer as the ruler of the video game world.  Contrary to popular belief, there are a multitude of communities within video game culture that do not fulfill the typical gamer stereotype.  The problem is that they lack visibility.  One reason for this is that many people do not want to reveal their association with video game culture out of fear of stigmatization.  Past research has shown this to be the case for the female gamer.  Because women in video game culture are often ostracized by their male gamer counterparts, female gamers are frequently forced to conceal their gender, only participating in video game culture when they can remain anonymous. When concealing their identities, females gamers try to change their voice when talking online, they will play as a male character instead of a female character followed by some kind of masculine name. Doing this, however, can make video games less fun and exciting and could cause the player just quit the game. On the other hand, it's different for the male gamer. Like girl gamers would choose a male character to play as the male gamer would sometimes choose a girl character to play as. But for the male to pick a girl character is very common in the culture. According to Bosson, Prewitt-Freilino, and Taylor, male gamers who try to be female characters are not harassed as much as girl gamers since the male gamers can simply undo the change or just reveal their true identities as a male which reduces the harassing.

When it comes to working into the video game development industry, there is a small minority of women within these industries. With 3% of programmers, 11% game designers, 13% of artists and animators, 13% of QA testers, and 16% of producers, these are low numbers for women in the video game development industry. The reason for this may be partly caused by the lack of encouragement due to the negativity or harassing of females in video game culture. Due to being the minority, women in the video game development industry receive stereotypical threats because of being in a male dominant career. There was a hashtag that was created on Twitter that was #1ReasonWhy in which it was reasons why there was a lack of women in the video game industry. Video game designer Kim Swift stated that "Because I get mistaken for the receptionist or day-hire marketing at trade shows."

Additionally, dominant perceptions of gamers as asocial, straight, white men are also challenged by the presence of gamers who do not identify as heterosexual.  For instance, it has been shown by past research that the LGBTQ+ community maintains a notable presence within video game culture.  For LGBTQ+ gamers, video games provide an alternate reality in which there is the opportunity for sexual expression, identity formation, and community building.  Such communities indicate the development of diverse subcultures within the culture of video games as a whole.

Gaming and popular culture

Games are also advertised on different TV channels, depending on the age demographic they are targeting. Games targeted toward kids and young teenagers are advertised on Disney Channel, Cartoon Network and Nickelodeon, while games targeted toward older teenagers and adults are advertised on MTV, G4, Comedy Central and in NFL Network.

Gaming as portrayed by the media

From the 1970s through even the 1990s, video game playing was mostly seen as sub-culture hobby activity and as a substitute for physical sports. However, in its early history video gaming had occasionally caught the attention of the mainstream news outlets. In 1972, Pong became the first video game pop-culture phenomenon. This was followed by Pac-Man in 1980. Other video games labeled as pop-culture phenomena include Final Fantasy, Halo, Metal Gear, The Legend of Zelda, Tomb Raider, Grand Theft Auto, Call of Duty, World of Warcraft, Fortnite, Street Fighter, Mortal Kombat, Pokémon, Guitar Hero, Sonic the Hedgehog, and the Mario games.

As games became more realistic, issues of questionable content arose. The most notable early example is NARC, which through its use of digitized graphics and sound and its adult-oriented theme quickly became a target of the press. These same issues arose again when Mortal Kombat debuted, particularly with its home video game console released on the Genesis and Super NES platforms; due to Nintendo's strict content-control guidelines, that system's version of Mortal Kombat was substantially re-worked to remove any 'extreme' violence. In response to these issues (and in parallel to similar demands made upon the music and movie industries), the ESRB was established to help guide parents in their purchasing decisions. 1993's Doom caused quite a stir, with its detailed 3D graphics and copious amounts of blood and gore. The 1996 game, Duke Nukem 3D, was accused of promoting pornography and violence; as a result of the criticism, censored versions of the game were released in certain countries. In the 1999 Columbine shootings, violent video games were for a time directly blamed by some for the incident, and labeled as "murder simulators".

In 2001, Grand Theft Auto III was released, which started the controversy over again.

Streaming

Television channels
The first video game TV show was GamePro TV.

The first television channel dedicated to video games and culture, G4, was launched in 2002. However, over the years, the channel has moved away from video game shows, and more towards male-oriented programs. X-Play, one of the channel's most popular shows and the highest-rated video game review show, is still produced at G4 until it was bought by Esquire Magazine, who decided to cease X-Play and focus less on the video game oriented audience of G4 and go with their traditional, more general male audience of their magazine.

Ginx TV is an international multi-language video game television channel, managed by the former MTV Networks Europe Managing Director Michiel Bakker.

There are also video game shows that appear on other channels, such as Spike TV, Fuel TV, and MTV.

In Korea, there are two cable TV channels fully dedicated to video games, Ongamenet and MBCGame, broadcasting professional game leagues that are held in Korea.

In Germany, most of the shows and channels dedicated to video games were canceled, although the content was highly appreciated by the video game audience. There was one digital cable and satellite channel with a focus on video games, which was closed in 2009: GIGA Television. Some of the hosts also did their show Game One dedicated to games on the German MTV channel until canceled 2014. The show is quite famous for their sketches on games and video game culture in Germany. The unofficial successor is the YouTube show Game Two, financed by public-service broadcasting program funk and produced by the 24/7 online channel Rocket Beans TV, which is dedicated to video game, nerd and pop culture. A similar show was "Reload"; produced for the public-service channel EinsPlus until the channel was announced to close in 2014. The Franco-German TV network arte has a show dedicated to video game culture: Art of Gaming

In Australia, there is one TV show that is based on video games and games. Good Game on the ABC (Australian Broadcasting Corporation) which broadcasts on channel ABC2. The show is also available as a podcast on iTunes.

In Russia, there are one satellite, the "Perviy Igrovoy" (Gaming First) and one cable, "Gameplay TV", video game TV channels. Channels have Internet streams.

Web series
AVGN is a show about a fictional character created by James Rolfe. The character is portrayed as a foul-mouthed, short-tempered retro gamer who reviews old video games usually sarcastically and negatively with frequent use of profanity for comical effect.

Pure Pwnage, was a fictional series chronicling the life and adventures of Jeremy, a self-proclaimed "pro gamer".

Red vs. Blue (made by Rooster Teeth), is a machinima (machine-cinema) filmed with the Halo series of games. The series consist of hundreds of short episodes taking place in their own Halo based universe.

Consolevania, a game review/sketch show produced in Glasgow, Scotland, was developed into a broadcast series, videoGaiden on BBC Scotland.

The Guild is a web series, created by Felicia Day, in which the cast are members of a guild that plays an MMORPG similar to World of Warcraft.

Game Grumps, a show on YouTube in which the cast plays games sent in by viewers. It has a related show called Steam Train where the cast plays games either on Steam or sent in by independent developers.

Influences on music

Video game music has been utilized by popular musicians in many ways. The earliest example was the electronic music band Yellow Magic Orchestra's self-titled album, released in 1978, which utilized Space Invaders samples as instrumentation. In turn, the band would have a major influence on much of the video game music produced during the 8-bit and 16-bit eras. During the golden age of arcade video games in the early 1980s, it became common for arcade game sounds and bleeps to be utilized, particularly in early hip hop music, synthpop, and electro music. Buckner & Garcia's Pac-Man Fever, released in 1982, featured songs that were both about famous arcade games like Pac-Man, Donkey Kong and Berzerk, and also used the sound samples from the games themselves as instrumentation. In 1984, former Yellow Magic Orchestra member Harry Hosono produced an album entirely from Namco arcade game samples, entitled Video Game Music.

Aphex Twin, an experimental electronic artist, under the name "PowerPill" released the Pacman EP in 1992 that featured a heavy use of Pac-Man sound effects. An entire music genre called chiptunes, or sometimes gamewave, have artists dedicated to using the synthesizer sets that came with past video game consoles and computers, particularly the Commodore 64 and the Nintendo Entertainment System. These bands include Mr. Pacman, 8 Bit Weapon, Goto 80, 50 Hertz and Puss. The influence of retro video games on contemporary music can also be seen in the work of less purist "Bitpop" artists, such as Solemn Camel Crew and Anamanaguchi. Moreover, many gamers collect and listen to video game music, ripped from the games themselves. This music is known by its file extension and includes such formats as: SID (Commodore 64), NSF (NES) and SPC (SNES). Cover bands like Minibosses perform their own instrumentations, and groups like The Protomen have written rock operas inspired by the Mega Man video games, while communities like OverClocked ReMix have released thousands of game music arrangements in a variety of genres and have influenced the careers of several game composers.

A comedy subgenre has developed increasing the popularity of several musicians including Jonathan Coulton, famous for the song Still Alive featured in the credits of Valve's Portal, and Jonathan Lewis, songwriter and composer credited with the Half-Life-themed parody album Combine Road.

Full orchestras, such as the Symphonic Game Music Concert tour North America, the United States, and Asia performing symphonic versions of video game songs, particularly the Final Fantasy series, the Metal Gear series, and Nintendo themed music, such as the Mario & Zelda Big Band Live Concert. In Japan, Dragon Quest symphonic concerts are performed yearly, ever since their debut in 1987.

Video game and film crossovers

Films based on video games

Examples of films based on video games include Street Fighter, Mortal Kombat, BloodRayne, Doom, House of the Dead, Alone in the Dark, Resident Evil,  Silent Hill, Tomb Raider, Assassin's Creed, and Warcraft.

Until 2019, films based on video games generally had carried a negative connotation for lackluster quality, typically attributed to the difficulties of translating an interactive work to a passive form of entertainment. The commercial and critical success of the films Detective Pikachu and Sonic the Hedgehog in 2019 led to a turnaround for video game adaptions.

Movies about video games
Hollywood has also created films that are about video games themselves. The golden age of arcade video games in the early 1980s led to several films based around arcade games, including Tron (1982), WarGames (1983), and The Last Starfighter (1984). The Wizard (1989) was notable for featuring the first look at the upcoming game Super Mario Bros. 3 for the Nintendo Entertainment System.

Most films related to video games in the 1990s and 2000s were subsequently adaptions of games, rather than dealing with the medium itself, though the concept of video games remained as a central theme in works like Grandma's Boy (2006), Stay Alive (2006), and Gamer (2009). The 2010s introduced a new way of film which expanded on using video games as virtual world within the film. These include Tron: Legacy (2010, a sequel to the original Tron), Scott Pilgrim vs. the World (2010), Wreck-It Ralph (2012) and its sequel Ralph Breaks the Internet (2018), Pixels (2015), Jumanji: Welcome to the Jungle (2017) and its sequel Jumanji: The Next Level (2019), Ready Player One (2018), Free Guy (2021), and Space Jam: A New Legacy (2021).

Interactive movies

Interactive movies as a computer and video game genre were the result of the multimedia expansion of computers and video game consoles in the mid-1990s, primarily because of the increased capacity offered by the laserdisc format. Interactive movies started on arcade machines in 1983, but quickly expanded to computers and video game consoles such as the Sega CD, the Phillips CD-i and the 3DO Interactive Multiplayer. The games are characterized by more emphasis on cinematic sequences, using full-motion video and voice acting. Interactive movie games have been made in several genres, including adventure games, rail shooters, and role-playing games.

The first interactive movie game was Dragon's Lair, originally released in the arcades in 1983, making it the first game to use a laserdisc and animation by Don Bluth, a man who worked for Disney on features like Robin Hood, The Rescuers, and Pete's Dragon, but later worked for other film companies like United Artists (All Dogs Go to Heaven) and Universal Studios (The Land Before Time). In Dragon's Lair, you control the actions of a daring knight named Dirk, to save a princess from an evil dragon, hence the name of the game. Since the dawn of this exact game, more and more companies have influenced the technology used and decided to make their interactive movie games for arcades and consoles. A more recent Interactive movie title is called 'Bandersnatch'. This movie sets you on a plot of a young 80's programmer named Stefan Butler. The movie lets the viewer choose different plot trajectories for the main character questioning reality throughout the way.

The birth of the 'interactive movie' genre was studded with unimpressive flops, though the genre later came into its own; at the time, video-capture technology was still in its infancy, with short (and often grainy and low-quality) video segments being the norm for games of any length.

Video game and traditional media forms
With the rapid convergence of all media types into a digital form, video games are also beginning to affect, and be affected by traditional media forms.

In history, the Television engineer Ralph Baer, who conceived the idea of an interactive television while building a television set from scratch created the first video game. Video games are now also being exploited by pay-TV companies which allow you to simply attach your computer or console to the television cable system and you can simply download the latest game.

Games act on television, with the player choosing to enter the artificial world. The constructed meanings in video games are more influential than those of traditional media forms. The reason is that 'games interact with the audience in a dialogue of emotion, action, and reaction'.  The interactivity means this occurs to a depth that is not possible in the traditional media forms.

Computer games have developed in parallel to both the video game and the arcade video game. The personal computer and console machines such as the Dreamcast, Nintendo GameCube, PlayStation 2 and Xbox offered a new dimension to game playing. The consoles have now largely been replaced by the Xbox 360, Wii and, the PlayStation 4, and the personal computer is still a leading gaming machine.

Games are the first new computer-based media form to socialize a generation of youth in a way that traditional media forms have in the past. Therefore, the 'MTV generation' has been overtaken by the 'Nintendo generation'; however, some refer to the current generation as the 'iPod Generation'.

Because they straddle the technologies of television and computers, electronic games are a channel through which we can investigate the various impacts of new media and the technologies of convergence.

See also

References

Sources
 

 
Nerd culture